Charles F. Wald (born 1948) is a retired United States Air Force general and former Deputy Commander of United States European Command. He retired on July 1, 2006, and was succeeded by General William E. Ward.

Military career
Wald earned his commission through the Air Force ROTC program in 1971. He has combat time as an O-2A forward air controller in Vietnam and as an F-16 pilot flying over Bosnia. The general has served as a T-37 instructor pilot and F-15 flight commander. Other duties include Chief of the U.S. Air Force Combat Terrorism Center, support group commander, operations group commander, and special assistant to the Chief of Staff for National Defense Review. He was also the Director of Strategic Planning and Policy at Headquarters U.S. Air Force, and served on the Joint Staff as the Vice Director for Strategic Plans and Policy.

Wald commanded the 31st Fighter Wing at Aviano Air Base, Italy, where on August 30, 1995, he led one of the wing's initial strike packages against the ammunition depot at Pale, Bosnia-Herzegovina, in one of the first NATO combat operations. He also commanded the 9th Air Force and U.S. Central Command Air Forces, Shaw Air Force Base, South Carolina, where he led the development of the Afghanistan air campaign for Operation Enduring Freedom, including the idea of embedding tactical air control parties in ground special operations forces. Prior to assuming his current position, he was Deputy Chief of Staff for Air and Space Operations at the Pentagon.

Wald, director and senior advisor to the Aerospace & Defense Industry for Deloitte LLP, is responsible for providing senior leadership in strategy and relationships with defense contractors and Department of Defense (DOD) program executives. He is a subject matter specialist in weapons procurement and deployment, counter terrorism, national, energy and international security policy. Prior to joining Deloitte, General Wald was the Vice President, International Programs for L-3 Communications Corporation, based in Washington D.C.

Wald has argued that there is a military option for a strike against Iran.

Wald serves as a co-leader of the National Security Project (NSP) at the Bipartisan Policy Center.

Football career
While attending North Dakota State University, Wald was a president of the Alpha Tau Omega fraternity and a starting wide receiver in the North Dakota State Bison football team. He was selected in the 14th round of the 1970 NFL Draft by the Atlanta Falcons.

Education

Assignments 
February 1971 - January 1972, student, undergraduate pilot training, Williams AFB, Arizona
May 1972 - February 1973, forward air controller, Da Nang AB, South Vietnam
May 1973 - May 1976, instructor pilot and wing flight examiner, Air Training Command, Craig AFB, Alabama
December 1976 - August 1978, project officer, Operational Systems Engineering Branch, Norton AFB, California
August 1978 - August 1981, F-15A aircraft commander, instructor pilot and flight commander, 22nd Tactical Fighter Squadron, Bitburg AB, West Germany
August 1981 - September 1982, student, Air Command and Staff College, Maxwell AFB, Alabama
September 1982 - August 1985, flight commander, assistant operations and operations officer, 71st Tactical Fighter Squadron, Langley AFB, Virginia
August 1985 - August 1989, Chief, Strategic North Atlantic Treaty Organization Branch; later, Chief, Strategic and Middle East-Africa Branch; later, Chief, U.S. Air Force Combat Terrorism Center; later, assistant executive officer to the Air Force Chief of Staff, Washington, D.C.
August 1989 - July 1990, student, National War College, Fort Lesley J. McNair, Washington, D.C.
July 1990 - March 1993, Deputy Commander for Operations, 86th Tactical Fighter Wing; later, Commander, 86th Support Group; later, Commander, 86th Operations Group, Ramstein AB, Germany
March 1993 - September 1993, executive officer to Deputy Chief of Staff of Operations, Boerfink AB, Germany
September 1993 - May 1995, executive officer to Director of Operations and U.S. Senior National Representative, Headquarters Allied Air Forces Central Europe, Ramstein AB, Germany
May 1995 - July 1997, Commander, 31st Fighter Wing, Aviano AB, Italy
July 1997 - January 1998, special assistant to the Chief of Staff for National Defense Review, Headquarters U.S. Air Force, Washington, D.C.
January 1998 - October 1998, Director of Strategic Planning and Policy, Deputy Chief of Staff for Plans and Programs, Headquarters U.S. Air Force, Washington, D.C.
October 1998 - January 2000, Vice Director for Strategic Plans and Policy, the Joint Staff, Washington, D.C.
January 2000 - November 2001, Commander, 9th Air Force and U.S. Central Command Air Forces, Shaw AFB, South Carolina
November 2001 - December 2002, Deputy Chief of Staff for Air and Space Operations, Headquarters U.S. Air Force, Washington, D.C.
December 2002 - July 2006, Deputy Commander, Headquarters U.S. European Command, Stuttgart, Germany

Flight information

Awards and decorations

Other achievements

Effective dates of promotion

References

Sources
 Deloitte LLP Biography for General Charles Wald
 
 

1948 births
Living people
American football wide receivers
Harvard University alumni
North Dakota State Bison football players
United States Air Force generals
United States Air Force personnel of the Vietnam War
Commanders of the Ordre national du Mérite
Recipients of the Air Force Distinguished Service Medal
Recipients of the Air Medal
Recipients of the Badge of Honour of the Bundeswehr
Recipients of the Defense Distinguished Service Medal
Recipients of the Defense Superior Service Medal
Recipients of the Distinguished Flying Cross (United States)
Recipients of the Gallantry Cross (Vietnam)
Recipients of the Legion of Merit
Sportspeople from Minot, North Dakota
Players of American football from North Dakota
Military personnel from North Dakota